Qepchaq (also Romanized as Qepchāq and Qopchāq; also known as Kipchak, Qebchāq, Qebjāq, Qeychāq, and Qobjāq) is a village in Jazireh Rural District, Ilkhchi District, Osku County, East Azerbaijan Province, Iran. At the 2006 census, its population was 620, in 169 families.

References 

Populated places in Osku County